Lebed is a gender-neutral Slavic surname meaning "swan". It may refer to:
 Aleksey Lebed (1955–2019), Russian politician
 Alexander Lebed (1950–2002), Russian general and politician
 Anatoly Lebed (1963–2012), Russian military officer
 Jonathan Lebed (born 1984), American criminal
 Mykola Lebed (1909–1998), World War II-era Ukrainian fascist war criminal
 Valeriy Lebed (born 1989), Ukrainian football midfielder

See also
 
 Lebid

East Slavic-language surnames